Irish stew is a stew native to Ireland that is traditionally made with root vegetables and lamb or mutton, but also commonly with beef. As in all traditional folk dishes, the exact recipe is not consistent from time to time, or place to place. Basic ingredients include lamb, or mutton (mutton is used as it comes from less tender sheep over a year old, is fattier, and has a stronger flavour, and was generally more common in less-affluent times), as well as potatoes, onions, and parsley. It may sometimes also include carrots. Irish stew is also made with kid. 

Irish stew is considered a national dish of Ireland.

History

Stewing is an ancient method of cooking meats that is common throughout the world. After the idea of the cauldron was imported from continental Europe and Britain, the cauldron (along with the already established spit) became the dominant cooking tool in ancient Ireland with ovens being practically unknown to the ancient Gaels. The cauldron, along with flesh-hooks for suspending the meat, eventually became preferred over the spit for feasting purposes, as evidenced by archaeological findings that indicate a predominance of flesh hooks over roasting spits in Ireland and Britain.  Many food historians believe that goat was originally the meat of choice, eventually being supplanted by beef and mutton.

The root vegetables and meat (originally goat) for the stew were then all in place, save for the potato. The introduction of the potato, originally a South American crop, did not occur until after the 16th century.

A 19th-century American recipe was recorded by Helen Stuart Campbell, a professor of domestic science at Kansas State Agricultural Culture. According to Campbell the stew was made with boneless beef or mutton, trimmed of fat and cut into small cubes, less than one inch square. To its broth were added onions and potatoes, and carrots (if beef was used), with a simple seasoning of salt and pepper. This stew was gently simmered for several hours and thickened with flour before serving.

Laws and regulations

Canada
According to Canadian regulations, commercially produced Irish stew must contain at least 20% mutton, lamb and/or beef, and 30% vegetables. It may also include gravy, salt, seasoning, and spices.

See also

 Bosnian pot
 Cawl
 Fårikål
 Galbi-tang
 Goat water
 Lancashire hotpot
 List of Ireland-related topics
 List of Irish dishes
 List of stews
 Nikujaga
 Pichelsteiner
 Scotch broth
 Scouse
 Stone soup

Citations

General and cited references 
 

Irish stews
American stews
Beef dishes
Canadian cuisine
Cuisine of Northern Ireland
Irish cuisine
Irish meat dishes
Lamb dishes
Meat stews
National dishes
Potato dishes